Super Mario Land is a 1989 side-scrolling platform video game developed and published by Nintendo as a launch game for its Game Boy handheld game console. It is the first Mario platform game to have been released for a handheld console. In gameplay similar to that of the 1985 Super Mario Bros., but resized for the smaller device's screen, the player advances Mario to the end of 12 levels by moving to the right and jumping across platforms to avoid enemies and pitfalls. Unlike the other Mario games, Super Mario Land is set in Sarasaland, a new environment depicted in line art, and Mario pursues the debuting Princess Daisy. The game has two Gradius-style shooter levels.

At Nintendo CEO Hiroshi Yamauchi's request, Game Boy creator Gunpei Yokoi's Nintendo R&D1 developed a Mario game to sell the new console. It is the first handheld console Mario game and the first to be made without Mario creator and Yokoi protégé Shigeru Miyamoto. Accordingly, the development team shrunk gameplay elements for the device and used some elements inconsistently from the series. Super Mario Land was expected to showcase the console until Nintendo of America bundled Tetris. The game launched alongside the Game Boy first in Japan in April 1989, and later worldwide. Super Mario Land was rereleased for the Nintendo 3DS via Virtual Console in 2011, which features some presentation tweaks.

The game was lauded by critics, who were satisfied with the franchise's transition to the Game Boy, but noted its short length; both contemporaneous and retrospective reviewers particularly praised its soundtrack. The handheld console became an immediate success and more than 18 million copies of Super Mario Land were sold, more than Super Mario Bros. 3. The game received two sequels, including Super Mario Land 2: 6 Golden Coins (1992) and Wario Land: Super Mario Land 3 (1994), the latter of which would later be spun-off into its own sub-series, Wario Land. Super Mario Land has been included in several top Game Boy game lists and debuted Princess Daisy as a recurring Mario series character.

Gameplay

As a side-scrolling platform game and the first in the Super Mario Land series, Super Mario Land is similar in gameplay to the Super Mario Bros. series. As Mario, the player advances to the end of the level by moving to the right and jumping across platforms to avoid enemies and pitfalls, the screen only scrolls to the right, as the player advances, but will not scroll back to the left, and sections of a level that have passed off screen cannot be revisited. Mario travels to Sarasaland to save Princess Daisy from Tatanga, an evil spaceman. Two of the game's twelve levels are "forced-scrolling" Gradius-style shooters where Mario helms a submarine or airplane and fires projectiles towards oncoming enemies, destructible blocks and bosses. Levels end with a platforming challenge to reach an alternative exit located above the regular exit, the former leading to a bonus minigame styled after a Ghost Leg lottery that awards 1 to 3 extra lives or a Superball Flower power-up.

Unlike the other Mario games, which take place in the Mushroom Kingdom, Super Mario Land is set in Sarasaland and drawn in line art. Mario pursues Princess Daisy, in her debut, rather than the series standard damsel in distress, Princess Peach. When jumped on, Koopa shells explode after a small delay, Mario throws bouncing balls rather than fireballs (referred to as "Superballs" in the manual), 1-Up Mushroom power-ups are depicted as hearts, and the level-end flagpoles are replaced with a platforming challenge. Compared to Super Mario Bros., which contains 32 levels subdivided into 8 "worlds" with 4 levels each, Super Mario Land is smaller, with 12 levels subdivided into 4 "worlds" with 3 levels each. There are five unique bosses, one at the end of each of the four worlds, and a fifth and final boss being Tatanga, who appears when the fourth boss is defeated. The first three bosses may be destroyed with projectiles, or the player may move past them to the exit without destroying them first; the last level has no regular exit, and the two bosses at the end of that level must be destroyed with projectiles to complete the level and the game. Some elements recur from the previous Mario games, such as blocks suspended in midair, moving platforms that must be used to traverse pitfalls, pipes that lead to other areas, collectible coins that grant an extra life when 100 are collected, and Goomba enemies. After the player has completed the game they may play through again on a harder mode, in which the levels are the same apart from enemies being more numerous; if the player completes the harder mode, the game allows the player to start another play on any level in the game.

Development

Super Mario Land was developed by Nintendo R&D1 and published by Nintendo in 1989 as a launch game for its Game Boy handheld console. Nintendo CEO Hiroshi Yamauchi believed that fun games promote console sales, so when the company created the Game Boy, he wanted a fun game featuring Nintendo's mascot, Mario. The task came to Nintendo R&D1, a development team led by Game Boy inventor Gunpei Yokoi. Yokoi had previously created the Game & Watch series and worked with his protégé, Shigeru Miyamoto, on the game that invented Mario, Donkey Kong. Super Mario Land is the fourth Super Mario game, the first portable Mario game, and the first in the series to be made without Miyamoto.

Absent Miyamoto's direction, the development team used elements new and inconsistent with the series as Super Mario Land shrunk elements of the series to fit the portable device's small screen. Yokoi, the head of R&D1, served as producer, and Satoru Okada served as director. They had previously developed Metroid (1986) and Kid Icarus (1986) together, and the two subsequently designed the Game Boy—Yokoi on its industrial design, and Okada on its engineering. Their Super Mario Land was planned as the portable console's showcase title until Henk Rogers brought Tetris to Nintendo of America and convinced Minoru Arakawa that the addictive computer game would help Nintendo reach the largest audience. The company subsequently chose to bundle Tetris with every Game Boy purchase.

The Game Boy was released in Japan in April 1989, North America in July, and Europe in September 1990, and Super Mario Land became a launch game. Its official first release was on April 21, 1989, in Japan, and its North American release followed in August. About 22 years later, Super Mario Land was released for the Nintendo 3DS via Virtual Console on June 6, 2011, as one of its opening games. Its new features include an increased size (about 60 percent zoom) and an optional "shades of green" color palette to match the effect of the original Game Boy's monochrome.

Reception

Sales
Following the Game Boy's "overnight success", Super Mario Land became the second best-selling 1989 release in North America (below [[List of Tetris variants|Nintendo's Tetris]]). Super Mario Land went on to sell more than 18 million copies worldwide—more than that of Super Mario Bros. 3 (1988).

In the United States, the game topped Babbage's Game Boy sales charts for two months in 1992, from August to September.

Contemporary reviews
Many critics saw Super Mario Land as a "smaller" and shorter version of Super Mario Bros. At the time of its release in 1989, reviewers were excited to have a portable Mario game. Paul Rand of Computer and Video Games called the game "an arcade machine in your pocket" and the graphics "remarkable" for their size. French games magazine Player One said that Super Mario Land adequately compromised where necessary to bring Mario to a portable device. Electronic Gaming Monthlys Steve Harris considered the game "fantastic" and "very fun to play", though short. Ed Semrad and Donn Nauert of the same outlet both declared Super Mario Land "easily the best Game Boy cart" of the time.

Tony Mott of Superplay said the game proved that Nintendo's Game Boy "had playability to match" its competitors. Matt Regan of Mean Machines agreed: "Playability to the nth degree!". British magazines Mean Machines and The Games Machine both commented on the many secrets to find. Player One too complimented the music. Player One further pronounced Super Mario Land a "masterpiece", "the pinnacle of portable video gaming".

Retrospective reviews

IGN's Lucas Thomas wrote that the protagonist, enemies, and overall game were shorter, and noted that Mario himself was just 12 pixels in height on the Game Boy's small screen. With this in mind, Thomas was concerned about player "eyestrain" in rereleases of the game. Still, IGN's Levi Buchanan thought the game made no compromises in its size reduction. Complexs Gus Turner wrote that the graphics were "simple", and Official Nintendo Magazine said the game was "ridiculously short". Eurogamer reported that the game could be finished in under an hour.Complexs Gus Turner wrote that the game had the fun, intuitiveness, and difficulty associated with the series. Eurogamers Chris Schilling called Hirokazu Tanaka's soundtrack "surely one of the all-time greats", and Official Nintendo Magazine said it was among the "greatest videogame music ever composed". Eurogamer and Complex too complimented the music.

Legacy

The game began a Super Mario Land series of portable Mario games. Super Mario Land 2: 6 Golden Coins added a non-linear overworld and introduced villain Wario, an evil version of Mario. The subsequent Wario Land: Super Mario Land 3 began the Wario franchise. After 19 years, the 2011 game Super Mario 3D Land for the Nintendo 3DS became Mario's first game in stereoscopic 3D. Audrey Drake of IGN argued that both Wario Land and Super Mario 3D Land are not "legitimate sequels", and wrote that the latter seems more like "Super Mario Bros. 3 with Mario Galaxy influences" than a successor to Super Mario Land 2. The Superball Flower appears in Super Mario Maker 2 as an unlockable power-up item, usable only in the Super Mario Bros. style.Super Mario Land is remembered for its miniaturized Super Mario elements and "twist on just about every Mario mainstay imaginable". Many of its new elements do not recur later in the series, making Super Mario Land strange compared to the rest of the series, or what IGN's Thomas described as a "singular oddball". IGN's Marc Nix said retrospectively that Super Mario Land was the only uninspired Mario game, with "funky voids of white" and UFOs instead of the "strikingly original" Mushroom Kingdom. Mean Machines was also put off by the alien theme, easy difficulty, and dot matrix screen blur. IGN's Travis Fahs wrote that the game was comparatively not as "ambitious" as Super Mario Bros. 3. Mean Machines said it was not "a true Mario game", not worth its originally high review score, and "in retrospect, not really a classic". Glen Fox of Nintendo Life agreed, writing that it was an impressive achievement at the time but did not age as well as other Mario games.Eurogamers Schilling wrote that Mario felt different—lighter, with more friction—and that the game felt "radical and distinctive" for the risks it took. IGN's Thomas cited "out of place" gameplay elements like the shooter levels, exploding Koopa shells, non-extinguishing fireballs, and non-Princess Peach plot as departures from the series. Thomas attributed this to Mario creator Miyamoto's lack of involvement in the game's development, which he described as "famously hands-off". Schilling of Eurogamer instead blamed the Game Boy's technical limitations. But he too was perplexed by the new sphinx, seahorse, and Moai head enemies, and considered the exploding Koopa shells a "cruel trick" disdainful of the series' core gameplay. Super Mario Lands shooter levels, new to the series, were not revisited in subsequent Super Mario games except the Maker games. Subsequent series games such as Super Mario Land 2 both dropped the original's tiny scale and chose the classic fire flower fireballs over the first installment's bouncing balls.

The game was included in multiple rankings of top Game Boy games, and Official Nintendo Magazine listed it at 73 in its top 100 Nintendo games. After her debut in Super Mario Land, Princess Daisy appears in later Mario series sports and racing games.

Popular music

The song "Supermarioland" (1992) by British group Ambassadors of Funk was inspired by the game and became a novelty hit, appearing in the UK top ten charts. Simon Harris, the mastermind behind Ambassadors of Funk, said that he initially had no intention to create Super Mario themed compositions, but after his friend introduced him to Nintendo's Game Boy console, he became fond of the theme music from Super Mario Land, composed by Hirokazu Tanaka. He realised that the songs on the game's score had a similar tempo to house music, so he was able to incorporate the samples into "Supermarioland" easily, recruiting Einstein to provide the rap vocals. After Harris created the track, he contacted Nintendo to clear the music samples, and the company, liking what Harris had done, also requested that he and Einstein record an album of Super Mario material. Nintendo UK quickly began to promote and market "Supermarioland", even providing an actor for the music video, but Nintendo of America was difficult to contact, and the track was never released in the United States. Mario's designer, Shigeru Miyamoto, approved the project, and the album, titled Super Mario Compact Disco, was released in Japan in August 1993, featuring tracks from other Mario games such as Super Mario Bros. 3 and Super Mario Kart.

 Fan-made Remake 

A homebrew for Super Nintendo Entertainment System called New Super Mario Land came to light in 2019 after a series of posts on Twitter by a user named ChronoMoogle. The remake features enhanced visuals, music and a multiplayer mode for up to 4 players. According to its creator, who gave an interview to Nintendo Life'' while asking to remain anonymous, the remake was built totally from scratch (hence, no ROM hacking was performed) using Assembly language, a few tools for graphics and sound and a Super Nintendo emulator for testing. After developing the game, the creator flashed the game in thirty Nintendo Power cartridges and distributed them to his "Nintendo-loving friends" as a Christmas gift to commemorate the 30th anniversary of the original game. The creator no longer has involvement with the game, stating that "the project is terminated already" after sending the gift cartridges.

Notes

References

External links
 

Mario video games
 
1989 video games
Alien invasions in video games
Game Boy games
Nintendo Research & Development 1 games
Side-scrolling platform games
Single-player video games
Video games developed in Japan
Video games scored by Hirokazu Tanaka
Video games directed by Satoru Okada
Video games produced by Gunpei Yokoi
Virtual Console games
Virtual Console games for Nintendo 3DS
Video games with title protagonists